Paolo Moffa (16 December 1915 – 2004) was an Italian film director, producer and screenwriter. He directed seven films between 1943 and 1982.

Born in Rome, Moffa started his career in the 1930s as a script supervisor. Mainly active as an executive producer, he was also second unit director for numerous films until 1958. He was the founder of the film company Società Ambrosiana Cinematografica. He was also a film editor and a documentarist.

Selected filmography
 The Last Days of Pompeii (a.k.a. Sins of Pompeii) (1950 - director)
 Husband and Wife (1952, producer)
 The Cheerful Squadron (1954 - director)
 The Island Princess (1954 - director)
 Hercules, Prisoner of Evil (1964 - producer)
 Five for Hell (1969 - producer)
 Sartana the Gravedigger (1969 - producer)

References

External links

1915 births
2004 deaths
Italian film directors
Italian film producers
Italian male screenwriters
Writers from Rome
20th-century Italian screenwriters
20th-century Italian male writers